Baloo, New South wales is a rural locality in the Snowy Mountains of New South wales and a civil Parish of the Buccleuch County.

Baloo is on the Snowy Mountains Highway, 10 kilometers south east of Tumut, New South Wales, Australia.

References

Parishes of Buccleuch County
Localities in New South Wales
Geography of New South Wales